Carl Andersson (3 January 1877 – 4 January 1956) was a Swedish long-distance runner. He competed in the marathon at the 1912 Summer Olympics.

References

External links
 

1877 births
1956 deaths
Athletes (track and field) at the 1912 Summer Olympics
Swedish male long-distance runners
Swedish male marathon runners
Olympic athletes of Sweden
Sportspeople from Umeå
20th-century Swedish people